The Census and Statistics Department (C&SD) is the provider of major social and economic official statistics in Hong Kong. It is also responsible for conducting Population Census and By-census in Hong Kong since 1971. Its head office is in the Wanchai Tower in Wan Chai.

Antecedent 
The history of population censuses in Hong Kong can be traced back to the 1840s. According to early government records, the first set of census results were published in the 2nd issue of H.K. Govt. Gazette (1841 May). Regular population censuses have been taken ever since, except for the main gap between 1931 and 1961.  In addition to population censuses, other statistics like number of ships entered, trade tonnage, public revenue and expenditure, death rate for European and American residents, number of schools, school attendance, number of prisoners and police strength were collected through various government departments in a scattered fashion.

In 1947, a Department of Statistics was set up under Mr. W. G. Wormal to organize a statistical system, working on such matters as retail price index and trade statistics. With the abortion of the idea of a population census scheduled for 1948 due to great fluctuations in the population in those few years, the Department of Statistics was disbanded in 1952. In its place a Statistics Branch was set up in the then Commerce and Industry Department headed by Mr. C. T. Stratton. Its work mainly concentrated on economic statistics, in particular trade statistics.

In 1959, following the decision to hold a population census in 1961, a temporary Census Department was set up with Mr. K. M. A. Barnett as Commissioner. It was disbanded in 1962 after the completion of the census operation. In 1963, Mr. Barnett was appointed Commissioner of Census and Statistical Planning in an office forming part of the then Colonial Secretariat with the immediate task of preparing a report on the statistics in Hong Kong and subsequently the further task of conducting a by-census in 1966. It was only following recommendations made by Mr. Barnett that the Census and Statistics Department was formally established in 1967 December.

Major historical events

Organisation and Management

Government Statistical Service 
C&SD together with statistical units established in various government departments and bureaux form the Government Statistical Service (GSS). The latter are generally called the "outposted statistical units".

Broadly speaking, most general-purpose statistics come under the responsibility of C&SD. The statistical units in various government departments and bureaux will take care of specific-purpose statistics (for dedicated use in their respective work) and provide necessary support in the application of statistics.

The Commissioner for Census and Statistics is the Government's principal adviser on all statistical matters and the head of the GSS. On the one hand, he fulfills his responsibilities by being the head of C&SD and, on the other hand, co-ordinates the work of outposted statistical units and monitors their technical standards. He is assisted by a Deputy Commissioner and five Assistant Commissioners in discharging his duties. The current Commissioner is Mr Leo YU Chun-keung and Deputy Commissioner is Mr CHOW Kam-tim .

Work of the C&SD 
The work of C&SD can be classified into three categories:
Conducting statistical surveys and operating statistical systems for the production of social and economic statistics including data series on such areas as population, external trade, commerce and industry, labour, prices, national income and Balance of Payments;
Performing statistical analysis and disseminating statistical data and analytical results; and
Providing consultation and support services on statistical matters to various government departments.

Organisation and Functions 
C&SD is organised into five divisions. The functions of these five divisions, each headed by an Assistant Commissioner, are :

a. Economic Statistics Division (1):
This Division deals with external merchandise trade statistics, price statistics and household and income statistics;

b. Economic Statistics Division (2):
This Division deals with sectoral economic statistics, statistics on science and technology, and statistics on companies in Hong Kong with parent companies located outside Hong Kong.  It also handles publication matters and organises human resources development activities for statistical grade staff;

c. Economic Statistics Division (3):
This Division deals with national income statistics and Balance of Payments statistics.  It also provides support in applications of information technology and handles data dissemination matters for the department;

d. Social Statistics Division:
This Division deals with demographic and other social statistics; plans and executes population censuses and conducts social surveys; and

e. Labour Statistics Division:
This Division deals with labour statistics and undertakes surveys of employment, labour force, payroll, wages and manpower.

In addition, there are three branches directly supervised by the Deputy Commissioner, namely Technical Secretariat, Development Branch and Administration Branch.

Census and Statistics Ordinance 
The main law governing the work of the C&SD is the Census and Statistics Ordinance, which provides for the taking of a census of population and the collection, compilation and publication of statistical information concerning Hong Kong and for matters connected therewith. The Ordinance also provides strict safeguards on the confidentiality of data pertaining to individuals or undertakings.

Statistics Advisory Board 
To ensure that the needs of various sectors of the community can be suitably taken into account in the development of government statistical activities, a Statistics Advisory Board was established by the Government in 1972. The Board is a non-statutory advisory body chaired by the Commissioner for Census and Statistics and consists of 11 non-official members and 3 official members. The non-official members offers a balanced representation from businesses, the academia and the community.

Official Statistics of Hong Kong 
Official statistics of Hong Kong comprise statistics compiled and released by various agencies of the Hong Kong Government.  Broadly speaking, statistics which are of a general purpose and useful to various functional areas are mainly compiled by the C&SD while those relating to more specific functional areas are compiled by subject government bureaux/departments concerned.  Official statistics of Hong Kong can be classified into different subjects, namely

See also 
 Census in Hong Kong

References

Citations

Sources 

 C&SD 30th Anniversary Commemoration Publication
 An Outline of Statistical Development

External links 
 
 2006 Population By-census
 2011 Population Census

Census And Statistics
Censuses in Hong Kong
National statistical services